Serre-lès-Puisieux is a village in the commune of Puisieux in the Pas-de-Calais department in Hauts-de-France in northern France.

Geography
Colincamps lies to the west, Hébuterne to the northwest, Puisieux to the northeast and Beaumont-Hamel to the south.

History
During the first two and a half years of the First World War, Serre-lès-Puisieux was held by the Germans and marked the northern point of the allied attack on the first day of the Battle of the Somme. The front line near the village remained more or less unchanged up until the end of the battle in November 1916. The Germans evacuated the village as part of their withdrawal in February 1917, but was lost by the Allies during the German spring offensive on 25 March 1918. The Allies retook the village on 14 August 1918, during the Hundred Days Offensive.

Cemeteries 

 Luke Copse British Cemetery
 Nécropole nationale de Serre-Hébuterne
 Queens Cemetery
 Serre Road Cemetery No. 1, 2 & 3
Sheffield Memorial Park
 Ten Tree Alley Cemetery

Although strictly speaking in Beaumont-Hamel, nearby cemeteries are:
 Munich Trench Cemetery
 Redan Ridge Cemetery No. 1, 2 & 3

See also 
 First day on the Somme – Serre
 Sheffield City Battalion

References

Geography of the Pas-de-Calais